New Upsala (Swedish: Nya Uppsala) also referred to as the Pine Lake Settlement, was an early pioneer Swedish-American community in Wisconsin. The short-lived settlement of Swedish immigrants was founded by Gustaf Unonius. It was located in the north central section of Waukesha County, Wisconsin, near the town of Merton, outside Delafield, in the area now incorporated as the villages of Chenequa and Nashotah.

Founding
Gustaf Unonius, an immigrant from Sweden, had a dream to establish a Swedish cultural and intellectual center on the frontier. He staked a claim on the east shore of Pine Lake, naming it New Upsala after the historic Swedish university city of Uppsala. By 1842, he and several associates had begun building the new settlement called Nya Uppsala. By 1848, several families had relocated to the community and a log cabin had been completed to house the Scandinavian parish at Pine Lake.

Shortly thereafter Unonius relocated to Manitowoc County, Wisconsin, where he became an Episcopalian priest. Much of the community subsequently disbanded. He had attracted an assortment of nobles, theologians, merchants, teachers and military officers. The choice of land was not a practical location for a settlement. The lake shore was stony and the soil unproductive. The colony failed almost as soon as it was started.

The Scandinavian parish at Pine Lake
The Scandinavian parish at Pine Lake was established March 3, 1844, with the dedication of Holy Innocents Cemetery. Its log cabin church was constructed and dedicated in 1848. In 1850 the congregation split, with one group forming St. John's English Lutheran Church of Stone Bank in Oconomowoc, Wisconsin. The other part of the congregation remained at the original log church and cemetery grounds. In 1864 this original church became known as Holy Innocents Episcopal Church, Nashotah. In 1895, the last survivor of the original Scandinavian parish legally transferred the land to Holy Innocents. In 1962, Holy Innocents merged with Grace-Holy Innocents Episcopal Church in Hartland, Wisconsin.  In 1975, the name was changed to St. Anskar’s Episcopal Church. Today there remains an active Holy Innocents cemetery on the former church site located on the west side of Highway C, approximately 1½ miles north of Nashotah exit off of Hwy 16.

At the request of the United States Ambassador to Sweden, the State Historical Society of Wisconsin commissioned the writing of a history of the New Upsala settlement. Completed by Filip A. Forsbeck and published during 1936, the history placed considerable reliance in Unonius's memoirs.

References

Further reading
Forsbeck, Filip A. New Upsala, the First Swedish Settlement in Wisconsin. Milwaukee, Wisconsin: 1936.
Stark, William F., Pine Lake. Sheboygan, Wisconsin: Zimmerman Press, 1984.

External links
St. John’s Lutheran church at Stone Bank
Nashotah House Theological Seminary
St. Anskar’s Episcopal Church
Holy Innocents Cemetery
Swedish-American Historical Society

Ghost towns in Wisconsin
Geography of Waukesha County, Wisconsin
Swedish-American culture in Wisconsin
Populated places established in 1842
1842 establishments in Wisconsin Territory